Richard Maurice Pellow (July 20, 1931 – December 23, 2019) was an American businessman and politician in the state of Minnesota.

Political career
He served in the Minnesota House of Representatives from 1989 to 1992 and in 1995 and 1996. He was a Republican.

Background
Pellow was born in Minneapolis, Minnesota. Pellow worked as a switchman for the Great Northern Railroad. He served in the United States Navy reserve and went to the Minneapolis Vocational School. Pellow owned an automobile towing business, body shop, and salvage yard.

References

External links

Republican Party members of the Minnesota House of Representatives
Businesspeople from Minneapolis
Politicians from Minneapolis
People from New Brighton, Minnesota
Military personnel from Minnesota
1931 births
2019 deaths
20th-century American businesspeople